Thelomma is a genus of lichenized fungi in the family Caliciaceae. The genus is widely distributed and contains seven species. Thelomma was circumscribed by Italian lichenologist Abramo Bartolommeo Massalongo in 1860.

References

Caliciales
Lichen genera
Caliciales genera
Taxa described in 1860